KK EuroNickel 2005 is a professional basketball club based in Kavadarci, North Macedonia named for the local ferronickel smelter operator EuroNickel. They currently play in the Macedonian First League. KK EuroNickel 2005 is the first ever Macedonian club to win an international trophy in basketball, they won the 2010-11 EUROHOLD Balkan League.

History
The club was founded on 11 January 1970.

Name: Tikveš (until 1995), Alumni Dekom Tikveš (1995-1997), Orka Sport (1997-1999), Tikveš (1999-2002), Feni Industries (2005-2019), EuroNickel 2005 (2019–present).

The team was taken under the leadership of the local FErro-NIckel mining company "Feni Industries AD" in 2005, while the smelter was under the control of Beny Steinmetz.

Since 2008, KK Feni has organized the international basketball tournament “Dimitar Gjorgjiev", in Kavadarci.
2008 Champions The team from Kavadarci won their second championship title in season 2007/08 beating BC Strumica in the final play off 4-3 series.
2010 Champions Kvadarci team won their third championship in the season 2009/10 by beating BC Vardar in the final series play off 4-3 drama. 
2011 Champions They won their fourth championship title in the season 2010/11 second in the row. This time the easiest final series against the heavy-weight BC Rabotnichki by 4-1 play off final series.
BIBL Kavadarci team is one of the founding members of the BIBL League competition. They competed for 5 successful seasons in the BIBL league. They reached four semi-finals in the row. Ending 4th in the season 2009 and third in 2010, 2012. In their last season, 2017, they finished 6th.

BIBL Champions Their biggest success came in the 2010/11 season winning the final four tournament in their home ground JASMIN ARENA. In the regular season they've finished 1 st in group B, having score 6-2, winning 3 games at home and 3 games away. Beating: Rilski 90:66 (humiliating victory), Mures 98:87, Balkan 101-72 (another humiliating victory) at home, and Mornar 95-84, Rilski 86-76, Balkan 83-76 away. At final four which was held in Kavadarci ,at home ground first they've beat Mornar in the semi-finals by 82-75 in the tight game. After that in the final game Kavadarci team had an easy game against Rilski beating them by 88-75 in festive atmosphere at JASMIN ARENA winning the Championship. 
In 2019, due to the difficulties of Steinmetz and because of the uncertain economic climate for the smelter's output, the company faced court-ordered administration. The result of this process was the sale of the smelter to an organization called Euronickel, who also took on the sponsorship of the basketball team.

BIBL League Seasons 
 2009: (5-7) 4th
 2010: (10-3) 3rd 
 2011: (8-2) 1st 
 2012: (7-6) 3rd 
 2017: (9-9) 6th

Home arena 
Jasmin Arena (Macedonian: " Јасмин") is a multi-purpose indoor sports arena located in Kavadarci, North Macedonia and seats 2,500 spectators.

The arena is used for basketball by KK Feni Industries. In May 2011, it hosted the Final Four of the Balkan International Basketball League.

Honours

Domestic Achievements   
 Macedonian Republic League Champion - 1985
 Macedonian League Champion - 2008, 2010, 2011
 Macedonian League Finalist - 2009, 2012
 Macedonian Cup Winner - 2008, 2010
 Macedonian Cup Finalist - 1997 (Tikveš), 1998 (Orka Sport), 2012, 2017

European Achievements   
 EUROHOLD Balkan League Champion - 2011 
 EUROHOLD Balkan League Final Four - 2009, 2010, 2011, 2012

Current squad

Depth chart

Notable players

 Goran Samardziev
 Vojdan Stojanovski
 Ognen Stojanovski
 Darko Sokolov
 Todor Gečevski
 Dušan Bocevski
 Marko Simonovski
 Vladimir Brčkov
 Kiril Nikolovski
 Bojan Trajkovski
 Dime Tasovski
 Slobodan Mihajlovski
 Goce Andrevski
 Zlatko Gocevski
 Toni Simić
 Aleksandar Dimitrovski
 Marjan Gjurov
 Andrej Magdevski
 Predrag Pajić
 Dušan Knežević
 Vladimir Popović
 Milan Preković
 Boško Jovović
 James Life
 Ivan Lilov
 Randy Duck
 Tim Burroughs
 Donald Cole
 Taliek Brown
 Jarrid Frye
 Mychal Ammons
 Matija Češković
 Karlo Vragović
 Giorgi Sharabidze
 Carlos Morban

Head coaches

 Emil Rajković
 Zare Markovski
 Ljupčo Malinkov
 Miodrag Kadija
 Goran Samardziev

References

External links
 Official Website
 Team info at MKF
 Eurobasket.com KK Feni Industries Page

1970 establishments in the Socialist Republic of Macedonia
Basketball teams established in 1970
Basketball teams in North Macedonia
Basketball teams in Yugoslavia
Sport in Kavadarci